Karl Meersman (born 14 September 1961) is a Belgian editorial cartoonist, living in Sint-Niklaas. He is known for his weekly caricatures in the popular magazines Trends and Knack. Meersman is married to former VRT-television journalist and presenter Lies Martens.

Meersman's art has been widely lauded in the press, in the art world, and in politics. He gained international attention when his work was displayed in the Belgian consulate in New York City, in 2006–2007.

Biography

Early life
Meersman comes from an artistic family.  His grandfather was a painter, and both his mother and father were professional artists.  When he was a young boy his parents took him to the art school in Temse, where they worked as teachers. At age thirteen, he entered a drawing contest for children, but was disqualified because the jury did not believe his entry was drawn by a child.

After deciding he wanted to follow in the footsteps of his parents, he dropped out of high school and attended different art night schools instead.  He was awarded degrees in publicity, printmaking, and figure drawing.  In the meantime his father sent him to a photogravure company, where Meersman held a day job. When his father's drawing workshop became too big to be run by a single person, he became permanently involved there. In 1991, together with two of his siblings, Meersman took over his father's drawing studio Meersman I.D. to manage the ever-growing work load.

Career
Initially, Meersman was mainly occupied with work in the publicity sector. He was hired as a caricaturist by Trends magazine in 1987 after he was noticed drawing visitors in a furniture shop, and has been drawing political cartoons for the magazine weekly ever since.  The economical magazine calls the cartoonist their "jester of the socio-economic society".

In 2002, he became the permanent illustrator for Focus Knack, for which he draws caricatures of showbiz people most of the time.

Artwork
The artwork for magazines is done using traditional techniques: watercolor and pencil on paper.  His interest in contemporary politics and news led him to political caricature as a living, and as he says: "I like to stand with both feet in the present, my work is a mirror of today."

As his biggest influences he names Egon Schiele and the satirical prints in the tradition of Félicien Rops, Toulouse-Lautrec, and Honoré Daumier. His style is described as realism with a strong eye for detail.

Besides caricatures and editorial cartoons Meersman also produces posters, stamps, paintings, and interior designs. In the past he also produced book illustrations and children's books.

Bibliography

Editorial cartoon
 Meersman; Karl (2010). VIPS TOO : very important paintings too. Roularta Books. 
 Meersman, Karl (2007). VIPS : very important paintings. Roularta. 
 Vandamme, Hugo and Cambien, Karel (2007). Illustrated by Meersman, Karl. Wat baten kaars en bril : management in spreekwoorden : wat je op school niet leert. Roularta. 
 Trends (2000). Illustrated by Meersman, Karl. België : tekenend en getekend 1990–2000 : Karl Meersman tekent tien jaar België / La Belgique traits pour traits 1990–2000 : Karl Meersman croque dix belges années. Roularta. 
 Seghers, Hendrik (1997). Illustrated by Meersman, Karl. De nieuwe collaboratie : een ondernemer in het verzet. Davidsfonds. 
 Trends (1993). Illustrated by Meersman, Karl. België in 30 hoofdstukken : over economie en politiek in de jaren '90. Roularta. 
 Uytterhoeven, Mark (1988). Illustrated by Meersman, Karl. Wat een jaar, beste spotliefhebber! : de hoogtepunten van het sportjaar 1988. Roularta.

Child and young adult literature
 Meersman, Karl (2002). Een melkje wolk. Afijn. 
 Kolet, Janssen (2000). Illustrated by Meersman, Karl. Wisselkind : roman. Davidsfonds. 
 Linders, Jac (1999). Illustrated by Meersman, Karl. De derde kans. Davidsfonds. 
 De Maeyer, Gregie (1998). Illustrated by Meersman, Karl. De koningste koning. Davidsfonds. 
 Langenus, Ron (1997). Illustrated by Meersman, Karl. Onder de zwarte heuvel. Davidsfonds. 
 Linders, Jac (1997). Illustrated by Meersman, Karl. Complot tegen Jesse. Davidsfonds. 
 De Maeyer, Gregie (1996). Illustrated by Meersman, Karl. Ach. Davidsfonds. 
 Langenus, Ron (1996). Illustrated by Meersman, Karl. Het geheim van de Zwarte Dame. Davidsfonds.

See also
 List of caricaturists
 List of editorial cartoonists

Notes and references

Further reading
 Herremans, Ben (2003). Karl Meersman : een getekend wereldbeeld / Karl Meersman traits marquant le monde. Roularta.

External links
 Karl Meersman official website
 Lambiek Comiclopedia article.

Living people
1961 births
Belgian editorial cartoonists
20th-century Belgian painters
21st-century Belgian painters
Belgian illustrators
Belgian caricaturists
Belgian humorists
People from Temse